Sellers is a small town in Marion County, South Carolina, United States. The population was 219 at the 2000 census.

Geography

According to the United States Census Bureau, the town has a total area of 0.7 square mile (1.8 km2), all land.

Demographics

As of the census of 2000, there were 277 people, 111 households, and 65 families residing in the town. The population density was 398.9 people per square mile (155.0/km2). There were 127 housing units at an average density of 182.9 per square mile (71.1/km2). The racial makeup of the town was 85.56% African American and 14.44% White.

There were 111 households, out of which 25.2% had children under the age of 18 living with them, 26.1% were married couples living together, 26.1% had a female householder with no husband present, and 41.4% were non-families. 38.7% of all households were made up of individuals, and 10.8% had someone living alone who was 65 years of age or older. The average household size was 2.50 and the average family size was 3.46.

In the town, the population was widely distributed by age, with 27.4% under the age of 18, 10.5% from 18 to 24, 29.2% from 25 to 44, 22.0% from 45 to 64, and 10.8% who were 65 years of age or older. The median age was 35 years. For every 100 females, there were 76.4 males. For every 100 females age 18 and over, there were 74.8 males.

The median income for a household in the town was $14,688, and the median income for a family was $16,964. Males had a median income of $19,531 versus $13,125 for females. The per capita income for the town was $6,325. About 50.7% of families and 50.0% of the population were below the poverty line, including 55.9% of those under the age of eighteen and 58.5% of those 65 or over.

References

Towns in Marion County, South Carolina
Towns in South Carolina